My Annoying Brother (lit. "Older Brother") is a 2016 South Korean comedy drama film starring Jo Jung-suk, Do Kyung-soo and Park Shin-hye. It was released in South Korea by CJ Entertainment on November 23, 2016. The film topped local box office and hit more than one million views within four days of its release. The film reached 3 million views in mid December.
The film was released in Japan on May 19, 2017.

Plot 
National Judo athlete Doo-young (Do Kyung-soo) damages his optic nerves during an international event and loses his sight permanently. His older brother Doo-shik (Jo Jung-suk) who has been estranged from Doo-young, takes advantage of his brother's sudden crisis to get paroled from prison. To Doo-young who lost his parents in an accident as a teenager and had to fend for himself since then, the news of Doo-shik coming home is an extra stress to deal with. He's barely adjusting to the fact that he is now blind for the rest of his life but now he has to deal with his swindler brother. Although hesitant at first, Doo-young slowly eases up to his older brother, who gradually takes charge and helps him adjust to his disability. Just when the two brothers are starting to make amends, Doo-shik finds out that he's in the final stage of terminal cancer. He has only a short time to say farewell to his brother and help him win gold at Rio Paralympics, which will secure his future.

Cast

Main cast 
Jo Jung-suk as Go Doo-shik
Jeon Ha-neul as Young Doo-shik
Doh Kyung-soo as Go Doo-young
Jung Ji-hoon as Young Doo-young
Park Shin-hye as Lee Soo-hyun

Others 

 Kim Kang-hyun as Dae-chang
 Ji Dae-han as Director of the National athletes
 Lim Chul-hyung as Jong Neon-nam
 Lee Do-yeon as a girl in the club with Doo-young
 Kim Jin-hee as a girl in the club with Doo-shik
 Son San as Parole auditor
 Shim Hoon-gi as Parole auditor
 Jung Jae-jin Owner of Super
 Moon Ji-hyun as a Bank staff
 Kang Doo as Foreign car dealer
 Goo Hye-ryung as Staff of Department of rehabilitation
 Lee Sang-hoon as Staff of Department of rehabilitation
 Jung Yoo-jin as Young Lover
 Park Jae-han as Police
 Son Mi-hee as Hallway nurse
 Jung Dong-kyu as Doctor
 Lee Myung-ha as Woman in the hospital
 Chun Seok-hyun as A hospital employee
 Jeon Ki-young as Narrator
 Choi Min-ho as Narrator
 Bae Sung-jae as Judo caster
 Kwon Ji-hoon as Japanese player
 Mama Daleev Par as Turkish player
 Jo Won-hee as Doo-shik's father
 Lee Yeon-soo as Doo-shik's mother
 Noh Yeong-hee as A lady in the neighborhood
 Hong Myung-gi as Designated driver
 Kwon Beom-taek as Guard
 Lee Han-ni as Doctor's voice

Production 
Filming began on October 19, 2015, in Songpa, Seoul, South Korea and ended on December 31.

Original soundtrack

Chart performance

Reception
Yonhap called the film a formulaic comedy but was nonetheless "funny and enjoyable" to watch. Both Jo and Do were praised for their performance and their chemistry which helped elevate the film.

Awards and nominations

References

External links 
 My Annoying Brother on CJ Entertainment
 My Annoying Brother on Naver
 My Annoying Brother on Daum
 My Annoying Brother on Movist
 My Annoying Brother on KMDB
 My Annoying Brother Don't Worry OST MV

2016 films
2010s Korean-language films
2010s buddy comedy-drama films
2010s sports comedy-drama films
South Korean buddy films
South Korean sports comedy-drama films
Films about blind people
Films about brothers
Films about cancer
Films about parasports
Films about the Paralympics
Films set in Seoul
Films set in Rio de Janeiro (city)
Films set in 2015
Films set in 2016
Judo films
2016 Summer Paralympics
CJ Entertainment films
2010s South Korean films